Kirk Olivadotti (born January 1, 1974) is an American football coach who is the inside linebackers coach for the Green Bay Packers of the National Football League (NFL).

Early life
Kirk Olivadotti was born in Wilmington, Delaware to Karen and Tom Olivadotti. Now retired, Tom spent 40 years coaching football at the high school, college, and professional levels, the latter consisting of 21 years as a defensive coach for NFL teams such as the Cleveland Browns (1985–1986), the Miami Dolphins (1987–1995), the Minnesota Vikings (1996–1999), the New York Giants (2000–2003), and the Houston Texans (2004–2005).

Kirk attended St. Thomas Aquinas High School in Fort Lauderdale, Florida  from 1988 to 1992, where he played wide receiver on the school's football team. He then went on to Purdue University where he received a Bachelor's degree in Education, followed by a Master's degree in Education Administration. While at Purdue, Olivadotti played as wide receiver and was a four-year letter winner from 1993 to 1996.

Coaching
Olivadotti began his coaching career at the college level, working with the Maine Maritime Academy's wide receivers and tight ends in 1997. He then spent two seasons (1998–1999) working as an assistant coach at Indiana State University.

In 2000, Olivadotti began coaching the Washington Redskins' defense. His time with the team would last for eleven seasons, making him the longest-tenured coach on the Redskins' staff at the time of his leave. He worked in various positions, including defensive backs assistant (2000–2003), defensive quality control (2000–2003; 2004–2005), special teams assistant (2004–2006), defensive line (2006), linebackers coach (2007–2009), and defensive assistant (2010). While working as a linebackers coach, Olivadotti tutored two linebackers, London Fletcher and Brian Orakpo, to their first Pro Bowl, the all-star game of the National Football League.

In February 2011, Olivadotti was hired by University of Georgia coach Mark Richt to be the Bulldogs' new linebackers coach. He filled the spot vacated by Warren Belin when he left for the Carolina Panthers. Olivadotti's father, Tom, had previously coached with University of Georgia defensive coordinator Todd Grantham for the Houston Texans. On January 16, 2014, it was announced that Olivadotti had rejoined the Redskin's staff to become their linebacker coach.

On January 24, 2019, Olivadotti was hired as the inside linebackers coach of the Green Bay Packers.

Personal life
Olivadotti married Keely Carter from West Lafayette, Indiana in February 2001. They have two children.

The family lived in Ashburn, Virginia while Olivadotti coached the Washington Redskins, However, during his appointment to the Georgia Bulldogs, Olivadotti and his family moved to Athens, Georgia.

References

External links

 Green Bay Packers bio

1974 births
Living people
American football wide receivers
Georgia Bulldogs football coaches
Green Bay Packers coaches
Indiana State Sycamores football coaches
Maine Maritime Mariners football coaches
Players of American football from Delaware
Purdue Boilermakers football players
Sportspeople from Wilmington, Delaware
Washington Redskins coaches
People from Ashburn, Virginia
St. Thomas Aquinas High School (Florida) alumni